Moravian dialects are the varieties of Czech spoken in Moravia, a historical region in the east of the Czech Republic. There are more forms of the Czech language used in Moravia than in the rest of the Czech Republic. The main four groups of dialects are the Bohemian-Moravian group, the Central Moravian group, the Eastern Moravian group and the Lach (Silesian) group (which is also spoken in Czech Silesia). While the forms are generally viewed as regional variants of Czech, some Moravians (108,469 in the 2011 Census) claim them to be one separate Moravian language.

Southeastern Moravian dialects form a dialect continuum with the closely related Slovak language, and are thus sometimes viewed as dialects of Slovak rather than Czech.

Until the 19th century, the language used in Slavic-speaking areas of Moravia was referred to as “Moravian” or as “Czech”. When regular censuses started in Austria-Hungary in 1880, the choice of main-communication languages in the forms prescribed in Cisleithania did not include Czech language but included the single item Bohemian–Moravian–Slovak (the others being German, Polish, Rusyn, Slovene, Serbo-Croatian, Italian, Romanian and Hungarian). Respondents who chose Bohemian–Moravian–Slovak as their main communicating language were counted in the Austrian censuses as Czechs.

On the occasion of 2011 Census of the Czech Republic, several Moravian organizations (political party Moravané and Moravian National Community amongst others) led a campaign to promote the Moravian ethnicity and language. The Czech Statistical Office assured the Moravané party that filling in “Moravian” as language would not be treated as ticking off “Czech”, because forms were processed by a computer and superseding Czech for Moravian was technically virtually impossible.

According to the results of the census, there was a total number of 108,469 native speakers of Moravian in 2011. Of them, 62,908 consider Moravian to be their only native language, and 45,561 are native speakers of both Moravian and Czech.

Dialects 
While the former regional dialects of Bohemia have merged into one interdialect, Common Czech (with some small exceptions in borderlands), the territory of Moravia is still linguistically diversified. This may be due to absence of a single Moravian cultural and political centre (analogous to Prague in Bohemia) for most of the history, as well as the fact that both of its major cities—Brno and Olomouc—used to be predominantly inhabited by a German-speaking population. The most common classification distinguishes three major groups of Moravian dialects: Central Moravian (Hanakian), Eastern Moravian (Moravian-Slovak) and Silesian (Lach). Some typical phonological differences between the Moravian dialects are shown below on the sentence ‘Put the flour from the mill in the cart’:

Central Moravian

Central Moravian dialects, or Hanakian dialects (Hanak dialects, Haná dialects), are spoken in the central part of Moravia around Znojmo, Třebíč, Brno, Olomouc, Přerov, Zábřeh and Šumperk. While the Central Moravian group traditionally contained many dialects native to specific microregions, today's spoken language across Central Moravia is moving towards a unified "Common Hanakian dialect". Features of this group include

 A prevalence of the vowels e and é in place of i/y (ryba > reba, život > ževot), í/ý (mlýn > mlén), and ej (nedělej > nedělé).
 O and ó in place of u and ou, respectively (ruka > roka, mouka > móka). By extension, the third person plural ending of verbs which would be -í in standard Czech, and -ej(í) or -ou in Common Czech, is -ijó, or sometimes just -ó in Central Moravian (prosí/prosej(í) > prosijó, hrají/hrajou > hrajijó/hrajó). The instrumental ending -í is also replaced by -ó (s naší kočkou > s našó kočkó).
 The ending -a instead of -e for feminine nouns and possessive adjectives is retained, as in Slovak (e.g. naša slepica for Standard Czech naše slepice).
 The verb “to be” has the 1st person singular present tense form su rather than jsem.
 In contrast to Common Czech, the -l on past tense verbs is always retained (nesl and never nes).

The dialects spoken in and around Brno have seen a lot of lexical influence from Hantec slang, a jargon incorporating many German and Yiddish loanwords into the local Central Moravian dialect. Although by the 21st century the slang had greatly declined in use, some vocabulary from Hantec is still used commonly in everyday speech, for example šalina instead of tramvaj for “tram”, from German elektrische Linie.

The Hanakian dialect has a literary presence. Writers who have written in Hanakian dialect include Alois and Vilém Mrštík, Ondřej Přikryl and Jakub Obrovský. Written Hanakian dialect often distinguishes between "wide" or "open" ê and ô (as in rêba, rôka), and "closed" e and o, to reflect dialects which pronounce these two sounds differently.

Smrť kmotřička (example text) 

Czech translation:

Eastern Moravian

Eastern Moravian dialects are transitional dialects between Czech and Slovak. They are spoken in the strip of land extending from Břeclav to Hodonín, Kyjov, Uherské Hradiště, Zlín and Vsetín. The Eastern group contains two dialects of specific interest, the Moravian Wallachian dialect and the Moravian-Slovak dialect. Features of Eastern Moravian dialects include:

 The distinction between soft l and hard ł (pronounced [w]) is usually retained (hlava, dělat = hłava, děłat). By extension, the final -l in past tense verbs is often rendered -u.
 aj sometimes retained instead of ej (vejce = vajco, dej = daj).
 In contrast to Common Czech, -ý- always prevails over -ej- (dobrý, strýc and never dobrej, strejc).
 Infinitives end in -ť rather than -t, as in Slovak (být = býť)
 The Moravian-Slovak dialect shares several other features with Slovak, including the use of the long ĺ and ŕ (hloubka = hĺbka, hrnout = ohŕňat).
 Wallachian dialects preserve the present transgressive, which is usually considered archaic in standard Czech aside from in a few arbitrary phrases.

Lachian dialects

Lachian dialects (Lach dialects), spoken in north-eastern Moravia and the adjacent regions of Silesia around Opava, Ostrava, Frýdek-Místek and Frenštát pod Radhoštěm, are transitional dialects sharing more features of Polish. Defining phonological features include loss of distinction between long and short vowels, a feature colloquially known as “krátký zobák” (“short beak”) in Czech, stress shifted to the penultimate syllable of the word, as in Polish, rather than the first syllable, alveolar consonants d, t and n often shifted to their palatal counterparts, and a distinction between “hard” (post-alveolar or retroflex) š, ž, č and “soft” (alveolo-palatal) ś, ź, ć, as in Polish. Silesian dialects also contain many German loanwords unfamiliar to other Czech dialects. The Lachian dialects are closely related to the Cieszyn Silesian dialect, spoken in the area around Karviná, Český Těšín and Třinec as well as on the Polish side of the border.

Bohemian-Moravian dialects
Bohemian-Moravian dialects, or South-eastern Bohemian dialects, spoken in the Bohemian-Moravian Highlands in western Moravia around Dačice, Jihlava and Žďár nad Sázavou are a transitional group between dialects of Bohemia and Moravia, sharing some features in common with Common Czech and others more in common with Central Moravian.

Linguistic features

Phonology

Moravian dialects preserve numerous archaic phonological features that are no longer used in contemporary Czech, but can still be found in many other Slavic languages. The following tables list selected cognates, pointing out the archaisms and showing their equivalents in the other languages:

Absence of the Czech ′a > e vowel shift

Absence of the Czech ′u > i vowel shift 

{| class="wikitable"
!Czech       !! Moravian   !! Slovak       !! Polish       !! Upper Sorbian !! Lower Sorbian !! Russian !! Ukrainian !! Slovenian  !! Prekmurje dialect  !! Serbo-Croatian !! English
|-
|duši  || dušu || dušu   || (duszę)  || dušu  || dušu || душу (dušu) || душу (dušu) || dušo  ||  düšo || dušu  || soul (acc.)
|-
|ulici || ulicu|| ulicu  || (ulicę)  ||             || || улицу (ulicu) || вулицю (vulycju) || ulico || vulico || ulicu || street (acc.)
|-
|chci  || chcu || (chcem)  || (chcę)   || chcu  || cu || хочу (choču) || хочу (choču) || (hočem) || (ščém) || (ho)ću|| I want
|-
|moři  || mořu || moru   || morzu  || morju || mórju || морю (morju) || морю (morju) || morju  || mourji || moru  || sea (dat.)
|-
|poli  || polu || poľu  || polu   || polu  || pólu || полю (polju)  || полю (polju) || polju  || poli || polju || field (dat.)
|-
|ji    || ju   || ju     || (ją)     || ju    || ju || её (jejo) || її (jiji) || jo || jo || nju/ju/je'''   || her (acc.)
|}

 Retaining the -šč- group 

 Retaining palatal consonants 

Grammar

While Moravian grammar tends to be similar to Czech grammar, there are some defining features. For instance, Moravian dialects apply a uniform pattern to the 3rd person plural ending of class IV -it verbs, and class III -et verbs, which in standard Czech traditionally varied in an unintuitive fashion:

Moravian dialects also occasionally use prepositions in a different fashion to Standard and Common Czech, usually mirroring usage in Slovak (e.g. něco k jídlu > něco na jídlo for "something to eat") or Polish (e.g. pojď ke mně > choď do mě, for "come to me").

 Standardisation 
Since the end of the 20th century, the private association Moravian Language Institute (Ústav jazyka moravského''), founded by waiter and amateur linguist Jan Kozohorský, has made attempts to standardise a literary Moravian language. The movement has been criticised by linguistics professors at Masaryk University in Brno as controversial and with strong political undertones.

Notes 
Content notes

Citations

References 
 BLÁHA, Ondřej. Moravský jazykový separatismus: zdroje, cíle, slovanský kontext. In Studia Moravica. Acta Universitatis Palackianae Olomucensis Facultas Philosophica – Moravica. Olomouc : UP v Olomouci, 2005. ISSN 1801-7061. Svazek III.
 Bartoš, František. Moravian Dialectology, Brno 1895.
 
 Šustek, Zbyšek: Otázka kodifikace spisovného moravského jazyka (The question of codifying a written Moravian language). University of Tartu, 1998. Available online (Czech)
 Šrámek, R.: Zur heutigen Situation des Tschechischen. In: Ohnheiser, I. / Kienpointner, M. / Kalb, H.: Sprachen in Europa. Sprachsituation und Sprachpolitik in europäischen Ländern. Innsbruck 1999.
 Vintr, Josef: Das Tschechische. Hauptzüge seiner Sprachstruktur in Gegenwart und Geschichte. München: Sagner 2001.

External links
 Multidialectal Czech-Moravian online dictionary

West Slavic languages
Languages of the Czech Republic
Moravia
Czech dialects